Conor Bradley (born 9 July 2003) is a Northern Irish footballer who plays as a right-back for Bolton Wanderers, on loan from Liverpool, and the Northern Ireland national team.

Club career
Bradley began his youth career with hometown club St. Patrick's F.C. at age nine. He went on to play for Dungannon United Youth and Dungannon Swifts, before joining the youth academy of English club Liverpool in 2019 on a two-year scholarship program. However, after a year at the club, he signed his first professional contract with Liverpool, lasting three years until 2023.

He made his debut appearance for the Liverpool first team in a preseason friendly with VfB Stuttgart in July 2021, playing the whole of a 30-minute mini-game. He also appeared as an 80th-minute substitute in the team's final preseason friendly against CA Osasuna on the 9th of August. He made his first professional appearance for Liverpool in a Carabao Cup tie against Norwich City in September 2021, becoming the first Northern Irish player to feature for a competitive game for Liverpool since Sammy Smyth in 1954.

On 21 June 2022, Bradley signed for League One side Bolton Wanderers on a season long loan and made his debut on 30 July in a 1-1 draw at Ipswich Town. He scored his first goal in the club's 5-1 EFL Cup victory over Salford City on 9 August. A week later, he scored his first league goal, the only one of the game in a 1-0 win over Morecambe

International career
Bradley played for the Northern Ireland under-16 national team in 2018, and captained the team to winning the Victory Shield. The following year, he appeared for the under-17 team, including in 2019 UEFA European Under-17 Championship qualifying.

In May 2021, Bradley was called up to the senior national team for friendly matches against Malta and Ukraine. He made his international debut on 30 May against Malta, coming on as a substitute in the 85th minute for Stuart Dallas. The match in Klagenfurt finished as a 3–0 win for Northern Ireland.

Personal life
Bradley is a native of Castlederg, County Tyrone.

Career statistics

Club

International

Honours
Liverpool Academy
 Lancashire Senior Cup: 2021–22

References

External links
 Conor Bradley at LiverpoolFC.com
 

2003 births
Living people
People from Castlederg
Sportspeople from County Tyrone
Association footballers from Northern Ireland
Northern Ireland youth international footballers
Northern Ireland international footballers
Association football midfielders
Dungannon Swifts F.C. players
Liverpool F.C. players
Bolton Wanderers F.C. players